Penquis Valley High School is a coeducational high school located in Milo, Maine, United States. Founded in 1968 (combining Brownville and Milo High Schools), the school serves students from Milo, Brownville, LaGrange, and Medford and Orneville Township. Michael Rollins is the Principal. The school is accredited by NEASC.

Athletics 
The school's mascot is a patriot and has uniforms with a blue, red, and white color schemes. Penquis has varsity sports teams in soccer, baseball/softball, track, basketball and cheering. The soccer team has experienced much success in the last few years.  Coach Jason Mill has made an incredible impact on the soccer program at Penquis Valley High School, leading them to the playoffs in the last 5 straight years.  Also, the baseball team fought hard for a playoff victory against Foxcroft Academy in the play-in round of the 2014 baseball season.  The basketball team has won the Class C State Championship twice. Once in March 2000, with an upset against Boothbay 58–45, and again in March 2013, against BoothBay with a score of 61–54.

Notable teachers
Nelson Madore, former Mayor of Waterville, Maine and Professor at Thomas College, taught at PVHS from 1967 to 1969.

References

External links
PVHS website
 http://bangordailynews.com/2013/03/02/sports/tourney-time/isaiah-bess-trevor-lyford-lead-penquis-past-boothbay-for-boys-c-basketball-crown/

Public high schools in Maine
Schools in Piscataquis County, Maine